Badda is a Thana of Dhaka District in the Division of Dhaka, Bangladesh. It was formed in December 1998 from parts of Cantonment Thana and Gulshan Thana. Badda is adjacent to Rampura, Gulshan and Baridhara Thanas.

Geography

Demographics
This Badda has a population of 157925. Males constitute 55.68% of the population, and females 44.32%. Badda has an average literacy rate of 58.5%, and the national average of 32.4% literate.

Administration

Badda has 2+4 Unions/Wards, 16+14 Mauzas/Mahallas, and 0 villages.

Suburbs under Badda Thana
 Banasree
 North Badda
 Middle Badda
 South Badda
 Merul Badda
 Badda DIT Project
 Aftabnagar
 Satarkul
 Beraid

Education

According to Banglapedia, Badda Alatunnessa Higher Secondary School, Satarkul School and College,  and Cambrian School and College, founded 2004, are notable higher secondary schools. And notable primary schools include Siraj Mia Memorial Model School. Badda thana has dozens of private kinder garden schools, few law schools, and several government primary schools. The area, especially DIT Project, is known for peaceful residential environment.

See also
Upazilas of Bangladesh
Districts of Bangladesh
Divisions of Bangladesh

References

Thanas of Dhaka